The 2017 Gibraltar Open (officially the 2017 jojobet.com Gibraltar Open) was a professional ranking snooker tournament that took place from 1 to 5 March 2017, at the Tercentenary Sports Hall in Gibraltar. It was the 16th ranking event of the 2016/2017 season. The main event ran from 3 to 5 March and was preceded by amateur pre-qualifying rounds on 1 and 2 March.
 		
Marco Fu was the defending champion, but he chose not to participate in this edition of the tournament.

Shaun Murphy won the tournament, beating Judd Trump 4–2 in the final.

Prize fund
The breakdown of prize money for this year is shown below.

Winner: €25,000
Runner-up: €12,000
Semi-finals: €6,000
Quarter-finals: €4,000
Last 16: €2,300
Last 32: €1,200
Last 64: €700

Total: €125,000

The "rolling 147 prize" for a maximum break stood at £20,000 (€26,600).

Main draw
Main rounds draw

Top half

Section 1

Section 2

Section 3

Section 4

Bottom half

Section 5

Section 6

Section 7

Section 8

Finals

Final

Preliminary rounds

These matches were played in Gibraltar on 1–2 March 2017. All matches were the best of 7 frames.

Round 1

 Match 1: 
 Match 2:  Jeff Cundy 4–3  Oliver Brown
 Match 3:  Thomas Rees 0–4  Barry Pinches
 Match 4:  John Foster 4–0  David Alcaide
 Match 5:  Sam Harvey 1–4  Michael Collumb
 Match 6:  Daniel Schneider 4–2  Matthew Glasby

 Match 7:  Joe Steele 4–1  Andrew Olivero 
 Match 8:  Ryan Causton w/o–n/s  Nader Al Dosari
 Match 9:  Joe O'Connor 4–2  Greg Casey
 Match 10:  David Lilley 3–4  Charlie Sweeney
 Match 11:  Joshua Cooper 4–0  Conor McCormack
 Match 12:  Alex Taubman 4–2  Michael Williams

 Match 13:  Danny Connolly 4–3  Matthew Day
 Match 14:  Daniel O'Regan 4–1  Jurian Heusdens
 Match 15:  Steven Hallworth 4–0  Francis Becerra 
 Match 16:  Mark Vincent 4–3  James Budd

 Match 17:  Simon Dent 4–0  Mike Collins
 Match 18:  Lee Prickman 4–3  John Fearick
 Match 19:  Joshua Thomond 0–4  Gerard Greene
 Match 20:  Ejler Hame 1–4  Ian Glover

 Match 21:  Richard Beckham 1–4  Brandon Sargeant
 Match 22:  Jenson Kendrick 1–4  Jamie Clarke
 Match 23:  Ben Murphy 4–2  Adam Stefanow
 Match 24:  Sean McAllister 2–4  Robin Otto

 Match 25:  Manasawin Phetmalaikul 1–4  Ian Martin
 Match 26:  Nev Graham 2–4  Phil O'Kane
 Match 27:  Andreas Ploner w/o–n/s  Mourad Naitali
 Match 28:  Hans Blanckaert 3–4  Francisco Sanchez Ruiz

 Match 29:  Felix Frede 0–4  George Pragnall
 Match 30:  Paul Burrell 4–0  Andrew Urbaniak
 Match 31:  Zack Richardson 4–0  Bhavesh Sodha

 Match 32:  James Dabell 4–1  Rees Carter
 Match 33:  Adam Longley 2–4  Dan Barsley

Round 2

 Match 34:  Charlie Walters 4–2  Simon Lichtenberg
 Match 35:  Louis Heathcote 2–4  Jeff Cundy

 Match 36:  Barry Pinches 3–4  John Foster

 Match 37:  Saqib Nasir 4–1  Michael Collumb
 Match 38:  Ben Jones 4–0  Daniel Schneider
 Match 39:  Laurens De Staelen 4–1  Joe Steele
 Match 40:  Adam Edge 4–0  Ryan Causton

 Match 41:  Joe O'Connor 4–3  Charlie Sweeney
 Match 42:  Ashley Carty 4–0  Joshua Cooper
 Match 43:  Peter Lines 4–0  Alex Taubman
 Match 44:  Matthew Roberts 4–3  Danny Connolly

 Match 45:  Stephen Kershaw 4–3  Daniel O'Regan
 Match 46:  Boris Lazarkov 0–4  Steven Hallworth
 Match 47:  Mitchell Grinstead 4–0  Mark Vincent
 Match 48:  Simon Dent 4–3  Lee Prickman

 Match 49:  Gerard Greene 4–2  Ian Glover
 Match 50:  Patrick Whelan 2–4  Brandon Sargeant
 Match 51:  Joel Walker 2–4  Jamie Clarke
 Match 52:  Martin Pitcher 4–1  Ben Murphy

 Match 53:  Robin Otto 1–4  Ian Martin
 Match 54:  Daniel Devlin w/d–w/o  Phil O'Kane
 Match 55:  Ashley Hugill 1–4  Andreas Ploner
 Match 56:  Francisco Sánchez Ruíz 0–4  George Pragnall

 Match 57:  Jaspal Bamotra 4–2  Paul Burrell
 Match 58:  Zack Richardson 4–0  James Dabell
 Match 59:  Kaif Shazad 0–4  Dan Barsley

Century breaks

Main rounds centuries
Total: 48

 145, 129, 106, 104  Jack Lisowski
 140, 137, 122  Shaun Murphy
 138, 135, 101  Mark Allen
 136  Sam Craigie
 136  Luca Brecel
 135  John Astley
 133, 131, 109, 102  Alfie Burden
 132, 102  Ricky Walden
 131  David John
 130, 108, 101  Neil Robertson
 129, 117, 102  Ryan Day
 129, 114, 112, 103  Judd Trump
 128, 102  Gary Wilson
 128  Gerard Greene

 127  Mark Davis
 127  Zhou Yuelong
 121  John Higgins
 118  Zhang Yong
 107  Michael White
 107  Ben Woollaston
 107  Zhang Anda
 105, 100  Barry Hawkins
 105  Jamie Jones
 104  Fang Xiongman
 102  Mark Williams
 102  Charlie Walters
 101  Mitchell Mann
 100  Steven Hallworth

References

2017
2017 in snooker
2017 in Gibraltarian sport
March 2017 sports events in Europe